Limoncito Wildlife Refuge, is a protected area in Costa Rica, managed under the Caribbean La Amistad Conservation Area, it was created in 1994 by decree 23141-MIRENEM.

References 

Nature reserves in Costa Rica
Protected areas established in 1994